A shar is a country subdivision in Iran and Azerbaijan.

The Turkish "Şehir" (city), is related.

See: 
 Subdivisions of Iran (Township)
 Subdivisions of Azerbaijan

Types of administrative division